Helene Ottilie Thimig (5 June 1889 – 7 November 1974) was an Austrian stage and film actress.

Personal life 

Helene Thimig was the daughter of actor Hugo Thimig and the sister of actors Hermann and Hans Thimig.

Thimig was married to the stage impresario Max Reinhardt from 1935 until his death in 1943. Thimig went into exile in the United States during the Nazi era, but returned to Europe after World War II.

Professional life 
Returning to Vienna from her American exile, she headed the Max Reinhardt Seminar, an acting school, from 1948 to 1954. Beginning in 1946, she directed the Jedermann productions during the Salzburg Festival. She had played the female lead (Faith) in that play for years under Reinhardt's direction and resumed the role from 1946 to 1951 and 1963 to 1965. She became an ensemble member at Vienna's Burgtheater in 1947; she moved to the Theater in the Josefsstadt (her preferred company) in 1954.

She died in her native Vienna in 1974, aged 85, of heart failure. She was cremated at Feuerhalle Simmering; her ashes are now buried in Neustifter Friedhof in Vienna.

Selected filmography

 Man Without a Name (1932) - Eva-Maria Sander
 The Gay Sisters (1942) - Saskia
 The Moon Is Down (1943) - Annie (uncredited)
 Edge of Darkness (1943) - Mrs. Frida Malken (uncredited)
 The Hitler Gang (1944) - Angela Raubal
 The Seventh Cross (1944) - Frau Anders (uncredited)
 Strangers in the Night (1944) - Mrs. Hilda Blake
 The Master Race (1944) - Matalie Rudan - George's Mother (uncredited)
 None But the Lonely Heart (1944) - Sister Nurse (uncredited)
 Roughly Speaking (1945) - Olga - Maid (uncredited)
 Hotel Berlin (1945) - Frau Sarah Baruch
 Isle of the Dead (1945) - Madame Kyra
 This Love of Ours (1945) - Mrs. Tucker
 Cloak and Dagger (1946) - Katerin Lodor
 The Locket (1946) - Mrs. Monks
 High Conquest (1947) - Frau Oberwalder
 Cry Wolf (1947) - Marta
 The Immortal Face (1947) - Henriette Feuerbach
 Escape Me Never (1947) - The Landlady
 Gottes Engel sind überall (1948) - Eine Dame in Grau
 The Angel with the Trumpet (1948) - Gretel Paskiewicz, geb. Alt
 Die Stimme Österreichs (1949) - Herself
 Decision Before Dawn (1951) - Fräulein Paula Schneider
 Undine (1955, TV movie)
 Das Mädchen vom Pfarrhof (1955) - Gerber-Leni, Sepps Mutter
 Winter in the Woods (1956) - Baronin Henny
 Die Magd von Heiligenblut (1956) - Kraeuter-Vetti
 Funken in der Asche (1962, TV movie) - Helene Langer
 Johann Wolfgang (1969, TV movie)

References

Bibliography
 Sutter Fichtner, Paula. Historical Dictionary of Austria. Scarecrow Press, 2009.

External links

1889 births
1974 deaths
Austrian stage actresses
Austrian film actresses
Actresses from Vienna
People who emigrated to escape Nazism
20th-century Austrian actresses
Austrian exiles
Austrian expatriates in the United States
Expatriate actresses in the United States